NA-263 Quetta-II is a constituency for the National Assembly of Pakistan.

Assembly Segments

Members of Parliament

Since 2018: NA-265 Quetta-II

Election 2002 

General elections were held on 10 Oct 2002. Maulvi Noor Muhammad of Muttahida Majlis-e-Amal won by 22,111 votes.

Election 2008 

General elections were held on 18 Feb 2008. Syed Nasir Ali Shah of PPP won by 24,936 votes.

Election 2013 

General elections were held on 11 May 2013. Mehmood Khan Achakzai of Pakhtun-khwa Milli Awami Party won by 38,552 votes and became the member of National Assembly.

Election 2018

General elections were held on 25 July 2018.

By-election 2023 
A by-election will be held on 16 March 2023 due to the resignation of Qasim Suri, the previous MNA from this seat.

See also
NA-262 Quetta-I
NA-264 Quetta-III

References

External links 
Election result's official website

NA-259